In enzymology, a glutamine—tRNA ligase is an enzyme that catalyzes the chemical reaction

ATP + L-glutamine + tRNAGln  AMP + diphosphate + L-glutaminyl-tRNAGln

The 3 substrates of this enzyme are ATP, L-glutamine, and tRNA(Gln), whereas its 3 products are AMP, diphosphate, and L-glutaminyl-tRNA(Gln).

This enzyme belongs to the family of ligases, to be specific those forming carbon-oxygen bonds in aminoacyl-tRNA and related compounds.  The systematic name of this enzyme class is L-glutamine:tRNAGln ligase (AMP-forming). Other names in common use include glutaminyl-tRNA synthetase, glutaminyl-transfer RNA synthetase, glutaminyl-transfer ribonucleate synthetase, glutamine-tRNA synthetase, glutamine translase, glutamate-tRNA ligase, glutaminyl ribonucleic acid, and GlnRS.  This enzyme participates in glutamate metabolism and aminoacyl-trna biosynthesis.

Structural studies

References

 

EC 6.1.1
Enzymes of known structure